Constantinois is a cultural and historical region of the Maghreb, located in northeastern Algeria.

Geography
The region corresponds roughly to six contemporary wilayas: Constantine Province, Annaba Province, Guelma Province, Skikda Province, Souk Ahras Province, Mila Province, and El Tarf Province.

The chief city of the region is Constantine.

Topography
A large part of Constantinois is dominated by mountain ranges, including the:
Babor Mountains
Constantine Mountains
Collo Massif

See also 
 Constantine department
 Ifriqiya — medieval period
 Battle of Philippeville

References 

Cultural regions of Algeria
Geography of Annaba Province
Geography of Constantine Province
Constantine, Algeria
Geography of Guelma Province
Geography of Skikda Province
Geography of Souk Ahras Province
Geography of Tébessa Province